St Bartholomew's Church, Newbiggin-by-the-sea is the parish church of Newbiggin-by-the-Sea, Tyne and Wear, England. The building is part of the Diocese of Newcastle.

History

The church dates from the 13th century and by the eighteenth century had become a ruin. The nave and chancel were restored in 1845, and a new chancel arch and organ chamber were built in 1898 by W.S. Hicks. The north aisle was rebuilt in 1912.

The church is noted for its dramatic headland site.

Organ

The church had a two manual pipe organ by Nelson and Co dating from around 1910. A specification of the organ can be found on the National Pipe Organ Register.

References

Church of England church buildings in Northumberland
Grade I listed churches in Northumberland